Braeside School may refer to:
Braeside School (Nairobi), a day school in Lavington, Nairobi
Braeside School, Buckhurst Hill, an independent school in Buckhurst Hill, Essex
Braeside School (Highland Park, Illinois), a school on the National Register of Historic Places in Highland Park, Illinois